Joseph Harrell may refer to:

 Joey Harrell, American former professional basketball player, played college basketball for UNC Asheville
 Joseph Harrell, American college basketball player for the University of West Georgia